The Maharashtra Intelligence Academy is the Maharashtra Police's law enforcement training and research center near Pune.  Operated by the bureau's Training Division, it was first opened for use in October 2009.

History
Special intelligence academy was proposed after 2008 Mumbai attacks.

Awards and acknowledgements
 Best Police Training Institute. (given by Government of India)
 ISO:9001:2015 Academy.

References